The 2009 NCAA Division I Women's Lacrosse Championship was the 28th annual single-elimination tournament to determine the national champion of Division I NCAA women's college lacrosse. The tournament was played from May 10 to May 24, 2009, and the semifinal and championship rounds were played at Johnny Unitas Stadium in Towson, Maryland from May 22–24. All NCAA Division I women's lacrosse programs were eligible for this championship, and a total of 16 teams were invited to participate.

Northwestern defeated North Carolina, 21–7, to win their fifth overall, as well as fifth straight, national championship. This would subsequently become the fifth of Northwestern's seven national titles in eight years (2005–2009, 2011–12) as well as the fifth of the Wildcats' eight consecutive appearances in the championship game (2005–12). Furthermore, Northwestern's win secured an undefeated season (23–0) for the team.

The leading scorer for the tournament was Katrina Dowd from Northwestern (24 goals). Dowd was also named the tournament's Most Outstanding Player.

Tournament field
A total of 16 teams were invited to participate. 9 teams qualified automatically by winning their conference tournaments while the remaining 7 teams qualified at-large based on their regular season records.

Play-in game

Seeds

1. Northwestern
2. Maryland
3. North Carolina
4. Penn
5. Duke
6. Notre Dame
7. Syracuse
8. Princeton

Teams

Tournament bracket 

* Host institution

All-tournament team 
Kari Ellen Johnson, Maryland
Brittany Poist, Maryland
Amber Falcone, North Carolina
Jenn Russell, North Carolina
Laura Zimmerman, North Carolina
Hilary Bowen, Northwestern
Katrina Dowd, Northwestern (Most outstanding player)
Meredith Frank, Northwestern
Hannah Nielsen, Northwestern
Danielle Spencer, Northwestern
Ali DeLuca, Penn
Katie Mazer, Penn

See also 
 NCAA Division II Women's Lacrosse Championship 
 NCAA Division III Women's Lacrosse Championship
 2009 NCAA Division I Men's Lacrosse Championship

References

NCAA Division I Women's Lacrosse Championship
NCAA Division I Women's Lacrosse Championship
NCAA Women's Lacrosse Championship